The 2002 Fresno State football team represented California State University, Fresno in the 2002 NCAA Division I-A football season, and competed as a member of the Western Athletic Conference. They played their home games at Bulldog Stadium in Fresno, California and were coached by Pat Hill.

Schedule

Coaching Staff

Roster

Game summaries

at No. 23 Wisconsin

San Diego State

at No. 13 Oregon

at Oregon State

at Rice

No. 22 Colorado State

SMU

at Boise State

Hawaii

Tulsa

Nevada

at San Jose State

at Louisiana Tech

vs. Georgia Tech (Silicon Valley Classic)

References

Fresno State
Fresno State Bulldogs football seasons
Silicon Valley Football Classic champion seasons
Fresno State Bulldogs football